Linner may refer to:
 Linner (meal), a meal between lunch and dinner also known as lupper
 The Linner hue index, a measure for hues of caramel colourings
 Oscar Linnér (born 1997), Swedish professional footballer
 Rizling Linner, a variety of wine-making grape
 Björn-Ola Linnér (born 1963), Swedish climate policy scholar